Krona may refer to:

Monetary units
 Austro-Hungarian krone
 Czech koruna
 Czechoslovak koruna
 Danish krone
 Estonian kroon
 Faroese króna
 Icelandic króna
 Norwegian krone
 Slovak koruna
 Swedish krona
 Yugoslav krone

Other uses
 Krona (comics), alien villain in DC Comics
 Krona space object recognition station, Russian military satellite detection station in Zelenchukskaya 
 Krona-N the second Krona satellite detection station, in Nakhodka 
Krona Plastics, a high-quality plastic home furniture company based in Kerala, India

See also
 Crown (currency)
 Krone (disambiguation)
 Koruna (disambiguation)
 Scandinavian Monetary Union, 1873–1914